The 1985 Pittsburgh Panthers football team represented the University of Pittsburgh in the 1985 NCAA Division I-A football season.

Schedule

Personnel

Season summary

Purdue

Team players drafted into the NFL

References

Pittsburgh
Pittsburgh Panthers football seasons
Pittsburgh Panthers football